General in Chief Gustavo Rangel Briceño (born 1956 in Maracaibo) is a Venezuelan military officer. He was Minister of Defense from January 2008 to March 2009.

He was born in the city of Maracaibo on 16 August 1956. He graduated from the Venezuelan Academy of Military Sciences in 1978, and has a degree on mechanical engineering, in which he achieved the cum laude distinction.

See also 
 Hugo Chávez

1956 births
Living people
People from Maracaibo
Venezuelan military personnel
Venezuelan Ministers of Defense